Nina Carberry (born 19 July 1984) is a retired Irish female National Hunt jockey. She hails from a racing family and is the daughter of jockey Tommy Carberry.

Career
Carberry got her first Cheltenham Festival win in 2005 on Dabiroun in the Fred Winter Juvenile Novices' Handicap Hurdle. It was the first time in 18 years that a female jockey won a race at the Cheltenham Festival. In 2005/06, she became Irish Qualified Rider Champion for the first time and repeated the feat the next season. At the Cheltenham Festival, she won the 2007 Cross Country Handicap Chase on Heads Onthe Ground, before winning on Garde Champetre in 2008 and 2009, to give her a record three wins in the race. She extended it to four wins in 2016 with Josies Orders when Any Currency was disqualified. In 2015 and 2016 she won the St James's Place Foxhunter Chase at the Cheltenham Festival riding On the Fringe. In 2011, she won the Irish Grand National on Organisedconfusion which was trained by her uncle Arthur Moore, becoming only the second woman rider to win the race. Between 2006 and 2016, she has competed in the Grand National six times, completing the course on four occasions. Her best result being a seventh-place finish on Character Building in 2010. In 2015, she won the Fox Hunters' Chase at Aintree riding On the Fringe.

On 21 September 2017, in her first race since November 2016, she won as a mother for the first time. Her win was on Cask Mate at Ballinrobe in the Connacht Tribune flat race. On 28 April 2018 the final day of the Punchestown Festival, Carberry announced her retirement after she won on Josies Orders for trainer Enda Bolger and owner J. P. McManus.

Other Work
In 2013, she became a racing assistant to Noel Meade. In 2015 she started riding out for Aidan O'Brien during the summer.<ref>{{cite news|last1=Kane|first1=Conor|title=Nina Carberry Q&A: 'You're never told here 'you can't do that because you're a girl|url=http://www.irishexaminer.com/sport/racing/nina-carberry-qa-youre-never-told-here-you-cant-do-that-because-youre-a-girl-365032.html|accessdate=30 April 2018|work=Irish Examiner|date=14 November 2015|archiveurl=https://www.irishexaminer.com/sport/racing/nina-carberry-qa-youre-never-told-here-you-cant-do-that-because-youre-a-girl-365032.html|archivedate=14 November 2015}}</ref>

Personal life
Her older siblings, Philip and Paul, were also successful Irish riders.

Nina married Ted Walsh Junior in February 2012. Walsh is the son of former jockey and Aintree National winning trainer Ted Walsh. Nina's brother in-law is top jockey Ruby Walsh and her sister in-law is the Irish ex-jockey Katie Walsh. Nina announced in November 2016 she was expecting her first child and would miss the remainder of the 2016/17 National Hunt season. She gave birth to Rosie in May 2017.

TV
In 2013, she appeared on documentary The Irish Road To Cheltenham'' which was shown on RTÉ One television in Ireland. In 2022, Carberry won the fifth series of Dancing With the Stars Ireland. In 2022 Carberry became a coach in Ireland's Fittest Family.

Major wins

 Ireland
 Champion INH Flat Race    -(2)  Leading Run (2006), Mick the Man (2007)

See also
List of female Grand National jockeys

References

External links

1984 births
Living people
Irish female jockeys